The Lotus 44 was an open-wheel Formula 2 racing car, designed, developed and built by the British motorsport team and constructor Lotus. It was powered by the  Ford-Cosworth SCA four-cylinder engine.

The Lotus 44 was manufactured in 1966 on the basis of the 1965 Lotus 35. The car got the wide suspension of the Lotus 41, which was successfully used in Formula 3 in the same year. The cars were fitted with Cosworth engines, but these were clearly inferior to the Honda powerplants used in Brabham's Formula 2 cars.

The Ron Harris team entered three 44s in Formula 2 in 1966. Jim Clark and Peter Arundell were only able to achieve partial success with the car. The victory was not possible and in 1967 a new car, the Lotus 48, entered the newly created Formula 2 European Championship with the Lotus.

References 

44
Formula Two cars
Open wheel racing cars